European heat wave may refer to::

July 1757 heatwave
2003 European heat wave
2006 European heat wave
2007 European heat wave
2018 European heat wave
2019 European heat waves
2022 European heat waves

See also 
 1911 United Kingdom heat wave
 1976 British Isles heat wave
 2010 Northern Hemisphere heat waves
 2013 British Isles heat wave
 2018 British Isles heat wave
 2021 British Isles heat wave
 2021 heat waves
 2022 heat waves
 Heat wave (disambiguation)
 List of heat waves